Bidmeshk or Bidmishk or Bidmoshk or Bidmushk may refer to:
 Bidmeshk, Qaen
 Bidmeshk, Sarbisheh